Mantzavinata is a village in the southwest of Kefalonia island, Greece, where the famous Mantzavino Wine is sold. Mantzavinata is 4 km southwest of Lixouri on the Paliki peninsula. Mantzavinata has three churches and a small square called Lemonata. A wine festival is held each August in Mantzavinata.

Geography
Mantzavinata is surrounded by hills, many covered with groves.  Farming and agriculture are the main industry in Mantzavinata, although due to the nearby beaches, tourism also plays a significant part in the economy. Together with the smaller village Vouni and the islet of Vardianoi, it forms the community of Katogi.

History
The Maspali hill was perhaps an ancient acropolis. At Vazza, a Roman mosaic was found and is displayed today at the Archaeological Museum of Kefalonia. Two of the three churches are original structures from the 17th century.

Until the 1940s, Mantzavinata was an important centre of wine and raisin production. World War II, and the complete destruction of the village in the 1953 Ionian earthquake increased emigration. It took until the mid-1950s to rebuild the village.  

The former farmland around Mantzavinata is popular for house building. Today many families built also their new homes outside of the center near the beaches Xi and Mania. This new settlement is also known as Kounopetra.

Name
The name 'Mantzavinata' comes from the Italian words mangiare (eat) and vino (wine), -ata is the typical ending for places in Kefalonia. Mantzavinata had several persons with the surname Mantzavinos/Mantzavinatos, one of whom founded a subdivision in Patras known as Mantzavineika. Another founded the Mantzavinateio Hospital in Lixouri.

Population

See also
List of settlements in Cephalonia

External links
 Website of the cultural association Mantzavinata & Vouni: "I Kounopetra"
 Katogi on GTP Travel Pages 
 Historical Photos of Mantzavinata on Europeana.eu

References

Populated places in Cephalonia